The Hitachi TR.1 was a small airliner developed in Japan in 1938, produced in small numbers as the TR.2. It was a low-wing, cantilever monoplane with retractable tailwheel undercarriage and a fully enclosed cabin. The design strongly resembled the Airspeed Envoy that it was intended to replace in Japanese airline service. Testing of the TR.1 prototype commenced on 8 April 1938 at Haneda Airport, but it suffered a serious accident on 22 June due to a landing in which one of the main undercarriage units failed to extend.

The TR.2 was a revised and strengthened design with a larger wing area, and main undercarriage that only semi-retracted. Twelve examples were built in a small series, but performance was not as good as the TR.1, since the modifications to the design had added 260 kg (570 lb) to the aircraft.

Specifications (TR.1)

References

 
 

1930s Japanese airliners
Low-wing aircraft
Aircraft first flown in 1938
Twin piston-engined tractor aircraft